The 1999 Connex Open Romania was an ATP men's tennis tournament played on outdoor clay courts in Bucharest, Romania that was part of the World Series of the 1999 ATP Tour. It was the 7th edition of the tournament and was held from 27 September through 3 October 1999. Unseeded Alberto Martín won the singles title.

Finals

Singles
 Alberto Martín defeated  Karim Alami 6–2, 6–3
 It was Martín's second singles title of the year and of his career.

Doubles
 Lucas Arnold Ker /  Martín García defeated  Marc-Kevin Goellner /  Francisco Montana 6–3, 2–6, 6–3

References

External links
 ITF tournament edition details
 ATP tournament profile

Romanian Open
Romanian Open
Connex Open Romania
September 1999 sports events in Europe